The Maestro is a solo album by American jazz pianist Horace Parlan featuring performances recorded in 1979 and released on the Danish-based SteepleChase label in 1982. The album consists mainly of jazz standards and show tunes. The same sessions also produced Parlan's album Musically Yours.

Reception
The Allmusic review by Ron Wynn awarded the album 2½ stars stating "Listen to moving and definitive solo piano".

Track listing
 "Ruby, My Dear" (Thelonious Monk) – 5:38
 "Spring Is Here" (Lorenz Hart, Richard Rodgers) – 6:29
 "A Flower Is a Lovesome Thing" (Billy Strayhorn) – 6:01
 "Peace" (Horace Silver) – 5:13
 "The Maestro" (Cedar Walton) – 8:15
 "Nardis" (Miles Davis) – 5:12
 "Alone Together" (Howard Dietz, Arthur Schwartz) – 6:19
 "Ill Wind" (Harold Arlen, Ted Koehler) – 6:43

Personnel
 Horace Parlan – piano

References

1982 albums
Horace Parlan albums
Solo piano jazz albums
SteepleChase Records albums